The Awkward Age is a 1994 Bosnian drama film directed by Nenad Dizdarević. The film was selected as the Bosnian entry for the Best Foreign Language Film at the 67th Academy Awards, but was not accepted as a nominee.

Cast
 Draško Trninić as Brankić
 Sedin Kahriman as Baja
 Igor Bjelan as Dule Dabić
 Esvedin Husić as Krsto Buva
 Milan Lazić as Branko Mandić
 Milenko Lazić as Ranko Mandić
 Biljana Preradović as Zora Tanković
 Sabina Tabić as Zora Kutić

See also
 List of submissions to the 67th Academy Awards for Best Foreign Language Film
 List of Bosnian submissions for the Academy Award for Best Foreign Language Film

References

External links
 

1994 films
1994 drama films
Serbo-Croatian-language films
Bosnia and Herzegovina drama films